Turakit Boonratanathanakorn (born 18 April 1989) is a Thai cyclist, who currently rides for UCI Continental team .

At the 2009 UCI Road World Championships he competed in the under-23 time trial. On the track he competed in the scratch event at the 2011 UCI Track Cycling World Championships but did not finish the race.

Major results

Road

2008
 7th Overall Tour of Thailand
2009
 Asian Road Championships
1st  Under-23 road race
9th Road race
2012
 10th Overall Tour de Brunei
 10th Overall Tour of Thailand
2013
 1st Stage 4 Tour of Thailand
 2nd  Team time trial, Southeast Asian Games
2014
 3rd Time trial, National Road Championships
2015
 2nd  Time trial, Southeast Asian Games
2017
 Southeast Asian Games
2nd  Team time trial
4th Road race
2018
 8th Overall Tour of Thailand
 9th Time trial, Asian Games
2019
 1st  Team time trial, Southeast Asian Games
2020
 10th Overall Tour of Thailand

Track

2007
 2nd  Team pursuit, Southeast Asian Games
2010
 3rd  Scratch, Asian Track Championships
2011
 3rd  Scratch, Asian Track Championships
2012
 2nd  Scratch, Asian Track Championships
2017
 Southeast Asian Games
2nd  Team pursuit
2nd  Scratch
 3rd  Team pursuit, Asian Indoor and Martial Arts Games

References

External links

1989 births
Living people
Turakit Boonratanathanakorn
Turakit Boonratanathanakorn
Place of birth missing (living people)
Southeast Asian Games medalists in cycling
Turakit Boonratanathanakorn
Cyclists at the 2018 Asian Games
Competitors at the 2007 Southeast Asian Games
Turakit Boonratanathanakorn
Competitors at the 2019 Southeast Asian Games
Turakit Boonratanathanakorn
Competitors at the 2017 Southeast Asian Games
Turakit Boonratanathanakorn